Yang Khram is a tambon (subdistrict) of Doi Lo District, in Chiang Mai Province, Thailand. In 2015 it had a population of 4,974 people.

Administration

Central administration
The tambon is divided into 11 administrative villages (mubans).

Local administration
The subdistrict is covered by the subdistrict municipality (thesaban tambon) Yang Khram (เทศบาลตำบลยางคราม).

References

External links
Thaitambon.com on Yang Khram

Tambon of Chiang Mai province
Populated places in Chiang Mai province